Heikki Kinnunen (born 8 April 1946, in Raahe) is a Finnish actor, who became well known in the beginning of the 1970s in the comedy program Ällitälli. Kinnunen was known specially for his roles in comedy films and -series. He has played the leading role in Vääpeli Körmy films and appeared in five Uuno Turhapuro films.

Kinnunen's most famous comedic catch-phrase is "Onks Viljoo näkyny?" ("You seen Viljo?") born from a skit in which he shows up asking people this question then inquiring something about what they are currently doing. Who Viljo is or why Kinnunen's character is looking for him is never explained in the skits themselves.

Films 
Lapualaismorsian (1967) - Hessu
Asfalttilampaat (1968)
Täällä Pohjantähden alla (1968) - Valenti Leppänen
Päämaja (1970)
Aatamin puvussa ja vähän Eevankin (1971) - Heikki Himanen
Lampaansyöjät (1972) - Sepe
Pohjantähti (1973) - Valenti Leppänen
Tup-akka-lakko (1980) - postman aka alias Interpol agent/teller
Pölhölä (1981) - Kalevi Käppyrä/Äijänkäppyrä
Kuningas jolla ei ollut sydäntä (1982) - Prime Minister
Koomikko (1983) -
Regina ja miehet (1983) - Raimo Harjanne
Uuno Turhapuron muisti palailee pätkittäin (1983) - waiter
Lentävät luupäät (1984) - Mr. Smith
Kun Hunttalan Matti Suomen osti (1984)
Pikkupojat (1986) - teller
Onks' Viljoo näkyny? (1988) - Uffa Hintman/Vähänen/constable Unto Kutvonen/man who asking after ViljoViljoa kyselevä mies/Urho
Uuno Turhapuro – kaksoisagentti (1987) - police
Vääpeli Körmy ja marsalkan sauva (1990) - sergeant-major Körmy
Uuno Turhapuro herra Helsingin herra (1991) - sergeant-major Körmy
Vääpeli Körmy ja vetenalaiset vehkeet (1991) - sergeant-major Körmy
Vääpeli Körmy ja etelän hetelmät (1992) - sergeant-major Körmy
Romanovin kivet (1993)
Vääpeli Körmy: Taisteluni – Min Kampp (1994) - sergeant-major Körmy
Uuno Turhapuron veli (1994)
Paratiisin lapset (1994)
Vääpeli Körmy ja kahtesti laukeava (1997) - sergeant-major Körmy
Johtaja Uuno Turhapuro - pisnismies (1998) - singing boozer
Hurmaava joukkoitsemurha (2000) - Hermanni Kemppainen
Uuno Turhapuro - This Is My Life (2004) - former banker
Pelikaanimies (2004) - postman
Lieksa! (2007)
Kummeli V (2014)
Iloisia aikoja, Mielensäpahoittaja (2018) - Mielensäpahoittaja

TV-movies 
Kuolleista herännyt (1975) - Antti Tanakka
Seitsemän veljestä (1976) - Aapo
Muistoja Elmosta (1981) - Immo
Isku vasten kasvoja (1988)
Jumalia ei uhmata (1988) - Huhtanen
Keskiyön aurinko (1991)
Hamlet (1992) - Hamlet
Palava rakkaus (1997) - Oskar Kallas
Ilmalaiva Finlandia (2000)
Paavo Pantteri (2002)

TV-series 
Kunnon sotamies Svejkin seikkailuja (1968)
Ällitälli (1971) - many roles
Merirosvoradio (1974) - many roles
Parempi myöhään... (1979) - charts singer
Valehtelijoiden klubi (1981–1983) (scriptwriter)
ÄWPK - Älywapaa palokunta (1984–1985) - many roles
Soitinmenot (1985–1987) - many roles
Kissa vieköön (1987–1988) - many roles
Heksa ja Leksa (1989–1991) - many roles
Lentsu (1990) - teller, voice of the virus
Kolmannen korvapuusti (1993–1994)
Pudonneita (1994) - shopkeeper
Konstan Pylkkerö (1994) - Konsta Pylkkänen
Jäitä hattuun! (1994–1995) - many roles
Lihaksia ja luoteja (1996) - Hautala
Uuno Turhapuro (1996) - deliverer
Olen Finni (1997) - many roles
Tunteen palo (1999–2000) - Jussi Juntunen
Kaverille ei jätetä (2000)
Tummien vesien tulkit (2002) - Heikki Kinnunen
Paavo ja Raili (2006) - Risto Kujansuu
Karjalan kunnailla (2007–2012)
Rakkautta vain (2017)
Kontio & Parmas (2018)
Mielensäpahoittaja: ennen kaikki oli paremmin (2019) - Mielensäpahoittaja

References

External links
 

1946 births
Living people
People from Raahe
Finnish male actors